United Nations Security Council Resolution 372, adopted unanimously on August 18, 1975, after examining the application of the Republic of Cape Verde for membership in the United Nations, the Council recommended to the General Assembly that the Republic of Cape Verde be admitted.

See also
 List of United Nations Security Council Resolutions 301 to 400 (1971–1976)

References
Text of the Resolution at undocs.org

External links
 

1975 in Cape Verde 
 0372
 0372
 0372
August 1975 events